A Vocational Education Committee (VEC) was a statutory local education body in Ireland that administered some secondary education, most adult education and a very small amount of primary education in the state. Before 1992 VECs had authority over the Dublin Institute of Technology and the Regional Technical Colleges. They existed from 1930 to 2013, when they were replaced by Education and Training Boards.

Establishment
VECs were originally created by the Vocational Education Act 1930, as successors to the Technical Instruction Committees established by the Agriculture and Technical Instruction (Ireland) Act 1899. The original purpose of the committees was to administer continuation and technical education for 14- to 16-year-olds. Continuation education was defined as "general and practical training in preparation for employment in trades", while technical education was described as "pertaining to trades, manufacturers, commerce and other industrial pursuits". To this end the VECs were charged with the duty of setting up and maintaining vocational schools.

Duties
Over time the duties of VECs increased, in particular in the area of adult education. These included:

Post-primary (secondary) education
Vocational Schools
Community Colleges

Further and adult education
Post-Leaving Certificate courses (PLCs)
Youthreach Services
Vocational Training Opportunities Scheme (VTOS)
Community Education
Adult Literacy and Basic Education
Back To Education Initiative (BTEI)
Adult Refugee Programme (ARP)

VECs also administered maintenance grants and bursaries for third-level education until 2012.

In September 2008, County Dublin VEC opened the first Community National School, in Porterstown, Dublin 15. This marked the first time a VEC had become involved in primary school education.

Organisation
VECs were originally established in each administrative county and county borough in the then Irish Free State. In addition, a VEC was formed in those municipal boroughs and urban districts which had a separate Technical Instruction Committee under the 1899 legislation (namely Bray, Drogheda, Sligo, Tralee and Wexford) and in the newly created Borough of Dún Laoghaire.

The number of VECs was reduced to the final number of thirty-three when five town committees were amalgamated with the adjacent county committees, leaving Dún Laoghaire as the only VEC area not consisting of a city or county.

Committees
Each Vocational Education Committee was elected by the county, borough or urban district council and consisted partly of councillors and partly of persons with an "interest and experience in education" and who could be recommended by bodies "interested in manufacture or trades".

The Vocational Education (Amendment) Act 2001 changed the composition of the committees, and parents of students under 18 and members of the staff were also entitled to elect committee members. Members could also be appointed to represent the interests of students, voluntary organisations, community organisations, Irish language interests and business.

List of Vocational Education Committees 1997–2013

Amalgamations and abolition
In October 2010 the Department of Education and Skills announced that the number of VECs was to be reduced from 33 to 16 by amalgamation In 2011 the new government confirmed that scale of reduction but revised the scheme of amalgamations It subsequently announced the establishment of SOLAS, a new steering and funding agency to cover the further education provision of the VECs, which also absorbed the training activities formerly carried out by FÁS.

Under the terms of the Education and Training Boards Act 2013 the VECS were dissolved, being replaced by 16 Education and Training Boards (ETBs) on 1 July 2013:

 County Dublin VEC and Dún Laoghaire VEC replaced by Dublin & Dún Laoghaire ETB
 City of Dublin VEC replaced by City of Dublin ETB
 City of Galway VEC, County Galway VEC and County Roscommon VEC replaced by Galway & Roscommon ETB
 County Cork VEC and City of Cork VEC replaced by Cork ETB
 County Kerry VEC replaced by Kerry ETB
 City of Limerick VEC, County Limerick VEC and County Clare VEC replaced by Limerick & Clare ETB
 City of Waterford VEC, County Waterford VEC and County Wexford VEC replaced by Waterford & Wexford ETB
 North Tipperary VEC and South Tipperary VEC replaced by Tipperary ETB
 County Donegal VEC replaced by Donegal ETB
 County Kildare VEC and County Wicklow VEC replaced by Kildare & Wicklow ETB
 County Mayo VEC, County Sligo VEC and County Leitrim VEC replaced by Mayo, Sligo & Leitrim ETB
 County Cavan VEC and County Monaghan VEC replaced by Cavan & Monaghan ETB
 County Laois VEC and County Offaly VEC replaced by Laois & Offaly ETB
 County Carlow VEC and County Kilkenny VEC replaced by Kilkenny & Carlow ETB
 County Longford VEC and County Westmeath VEC replaced by Longford & Westmeath ETB
 County Meath VEC and County Louth VEC replaced by Louth & Meath ETB

References

External links
 Irish Vocational Education Association
Education in the Republic of Ireland
Secondary education in Ireland